Hangzhou Bus Rapid Transit (BRT) is a bus rapid transit system in Hangzhou, Zhejiang, China. It began operations in 2006 with 27.2 km of service (7 km of busway). The system was expanded with two additional line extensions in 2008, 2009 and 2010 now provide passengers with 55.4 km (18.8 km of busways) of BRT service.

References

External links 
 Hangzhou Public Transport Group Co website (Chinese)

Transport in Hangzhou
Bus rapid transit in China